The Mauritius Davis Cup team represents Mauritius in Davis Cup tennis competition and are governed by the Mauritius Tennis Federation. They have not competed from 2007 and 2021. They returned in 2022

Mauritius currently compete in the Europe/Africa Zone of Group IV.  They finished 5th in Group III in 2001.

History
Mauritius competed in its first Davis Cup in 2000.

Current team (2022) 

 Lucas Alexander Lai Fat Fur
 Jake Lam Hau Ching
 Ryan Chee Tat Wong Pin Young
 Lukasz Skowronski (Captain-player)

See also
Davis Cup
Mauritius Fed Cup team

External links

Davis Cup teams
Davis Cup
Davis Cup